is a Japanese professional footballer who plays as a right winger or a right back for J1 League club Shimizu S-Pulse.

Career
Kishimoto was loaned out from Cerezo Osaka to Tokushima Vortis for the 2019 season. However, it was announced on 16 August 2019, that Tokushima Vortis had signed him permanently.

Club statistics
.

Honours

International

Japan U-19
 AFC U-19 Championship 2016

References

External links
 Profile at Shimizu S-Pulse
 
 

1997 births
Living people
Association football people from Nara Prefecture
Japanese footballers
J2 League players
J3 League players
Cerezo Osaka players
Cerezo Osaka U-23 players
Mito HollyHock players
Tokushima Vortis players
Shimizu S-Pulse players
Association football forwards